XHES-FM is a radio station in Chihuahua, Chihuahua. Broadcasting on 102.5 FM, XHES is owned by GRD Multimedia and carries a news/talk format known as Antena 102.5 FM.

History
XHES received its concession on December 17, 1976 as XEES-AM 1110 (later 760). It migrated to FM in 2011.

References

Radio stations in Chihuahua
Mass media in Chihuahua City